Melissa Kelly may refer to:

 Melissa J. Kelly, member of the Maryland House of Delegates
 Melissa Kelly (chef), American chef